Divyanka Tripathi Dahiya ( Tripathi; born 14 December 1984) is an Indian television actress. She is known for playing Vidya Pratap Singh in Zee TV's Banoo Main Teri Dulhann and Dr. Ishita Iyer Bhalla in Star Plus's Yeh Hai Mohabbatein. In 2017, participated in the dance reality show Nach Baliye 8 and emerged as the winner. In 2021, she participated at Fear Factor: Khatron Ke Khiladi 11 as a contestant where she emerged as the runner-up.

Early life
Tripathi was born on 14 December 1984 in Bhopal, Madhya Pradesh. She attended Nutan College in Bhopal. She completed a mountaineering course from the Nehru Institute of Mountaineering in Uttarkashi.

Career 
Tripathi started her career as an anchor on All India Radio, Bhopal. She participated in Pantene Zee Teen Queen in 2003 and won the title of Miss Beautiful Skin. In 2004, Tripathi participated in India's Best Cinestars Ki Khoj and ended up being in top 8 from Bhopal zone. She again contested from the Indore zone where she was declared the runner up. This ensured her qualification for phase 2 of the contest where she lost eventually. In 2005, she was crowned Miss Bhopal.

Tripathi made her acting debut in a telefilm for Doordarshan and later presented a show called Akash Vani. In 2005, she acted in Star One's Yeh Dil Chahe More as Payal followed by Viraasat as Melanie in 2006. In August 2006, Tripathi was roped in for Zee TV's drama fiction Banoo Main Teri Dulhann by playing the dual roles of Vidya and Divya. She received recognition for the role of Vidya and her onscreen pair with Sharad Malhotra. She won many awards for her performance in the show including the Indian Television Academy Award for Best Actress in Drama Category and the Indian Telly Award for Fresh New Face. The show ran for three years and ended in 2009. She participated in Zee TV's Khana Khazana as a contestant in 2006.

In 2007, Tripathi participated in Sahara One's reality show, Jjhoom India as a contestant. In 2008, she participated in Imagine TV's Nachle Ve with Saroj Khan. In the same year she presented 9X's Jalwa Four 2 Ka 1. In 2009, Tripathi featured in the second season of StarPlus's horror thriller Ssshhhh...Phir Koi Hai. In 2010, she played the role of Rashmi Sharma, a housewife in SAB TV's comedy drama Mrs. & Mr. Sharma Allahabadwale. In 2011 Tripathi participated in Imagine TV's Zor Ka Jhatka: Total Wipeout. She later played the lead in SAB TV's Chintu Chinki Aur Ek Badi Si Love Story as Suman, followed by appearing in an episodic appearance in Adaalat. In 2012, she acted in Star Plus's Teri Meri Love Stories as Nikita opposite Iqbal Khan.

In 2013, she portrayed the character of Dr. Ishita Bhalla, an infertile dentist who marries a chief executive officer, in order to provide maternal affection to his daughter in Ekta Kapoor's show Yeh Hai Mohabbatein opposite Karan Patel. 
The show premiered in December 2013 and ran successfully for six years until it ended at the end of 2019. Her portrayal of Ishita won her many awards and nominations such as the Indian Telly Award for Best Actress in a Lead Role, the Lions Gold Award for Best Actress in Lead Role, and the Boroplus Gold Award for Best Actress in a Lead Role. In 2015, she received a Shan-E-Bhopal Award. In 2016, she received two awards at the Gold Awards for Face of The Year and Best Actress in a Lead Role.

In 2016, Tripathi participated in Colors TV's sports reality show, Box Cricket League 2. Later in the same year, she made an cameo appearance in Life OK's Bahu Hamari Rajni Kant along with Anita Hassanandani, Hina Khan and Karanvir Bohra. In 2017, she participated in Nach Baliye 8 with her husband Vivek Dahiya and emerged as the winner whilst Mohit Sehgal, Sanaya Irani became finalists.

In 2018, Tripathi made an appearance on Kanpur Wale Khuranas. In early 2019, Tripathi presented Star Plus's singing reality show The Voice 3. In June 2019, Tripathi made an cameo appearance in Kahaan Hum Kahaan Tum starring Dipika Kakar. In 2020, she made an appearance on The Greedy Closet. In December 2020, Tripathi presented Sony TV's crime show, Crime Patrol until March 2021. In 2021, she participated in Colors TV's stunt based reality show, Fear Factor: Khatron Ke Khiladi 11 as a contestant.

Tripathi honored with Champions of Change (award) 2021.

Personal life
Tripathi dated actor Sharad Malhotra, her co-actor from Banoo Main Teri Dulhann, but they broke up in 2015.

On 16 January 2016, she got engaged to her Ye Hai Mohabbatein co-actor Vivek Dahiya. The couple got married on 8 July 2016 in Bhopal.

In the media
In 2014, Tripathi was ranked 23 among the "35 Hottest Actresses In Indian Television" by MensXP.com, an Indian lifestyle website for men.

In 2017, she became the first Indian television actress who appeared in the Forbes Celebrity 100, a list based on the income and popularity of India's celebrities.

In 2017, Tripathi posted some emotional tweets condemning the rape of a 12-year-old girl in Chandigarh on Independence Day (15 August), some of which she addressed to Prime Minister Narendra Modi, urging him to take strict action against the rapist.

In the same year, Tripathi was trolled for her character Haryanavi from the serial Yeh Hai Mohabbatein. She was called pathetic and disgusting for using dark brown makeup for this role. About this Tripathi replied to the troll by saying:

In 2020, Tripathi won the title of "International Iconic Most Popular Face Of Indian Television 2020"

Filmography

Television

Special appearances

Films

Web series

Music videos

Awards and nominations

See also
 List of Hindi television actresses 
 List of Indian television actresses

References

External links 

Living people
1984 births
Actresses from Bhopal
Indian television actresses
Indian soap opera actresses
Indian web series actresses
Indian film actresses
Actresses in Hindi cinema
Actresses in Hindi television
Actresses from Mumbai
Indian beauty pageant winners
Female models from Madhya Pradesh
Nach Baliye winners
Fear Factor: Khatron Ke Khiladi participants
21st-century Indian actresses